Tekoa is an Israeli settlement organized as a  community settlement in the West Bank, located 20 km northeast of Hebron, 16 km south of Jerusalem and in the immediate vicinity of the Palestinian village of Tuqu'. It falls under the jurisdiction of Gush Etzion Regional Council.

The international community considers Israeli settlements in the West Bank illegal under international law, but the Israeli government disputes this.

History

Founding

Tekoa was established in 1975 as a Nahal outpost in the vicinity of the Palestinian village of Tuqu'. In 1977 it was handed over to civilian residents. It is named after the hometown of the Biblical prophet Amos, whereupon the neighbouring settlement of Nokdim indicates his profession (shepherd) - see .

Tekoa is built on 1071 dunam of land which, according to  ARIJ, Israel confiscated from the Palestinian citizens of Tuqu'.

The town is located 5 miles south of Bethlehem at the foot of Herodion ("Herod's Palace").

Archaeology and landmarks

The archaeological site of El Khiam is located in this area.

Letters of Shimon Ben Kosiba, leader of the Jewish Bar Kokhba revolt against Roman occupation (132-135 CE), were found in a valley near Tekoa.

Ancient caves and caves that were dug in the karst chalk stone of the Nachal Tekoa or Wadi Khureitun, named after Chariton the Confessor, by monks from the Lavras of Saint Chariton and his successor Euthymius the Great, are right behind Tekoa.

Outside Tekoa, at Khirbet Tuqu', various ruins were seen in the mid-19th century. These included the walls of houses, cisterns, broken columns and heaps of building stones, some of which had “bevelled edges” which supposedly indicated Hebrew origin.

Byzantine ceramics have been found, and in the ancient site of nearby Tekoa ruins (Arab.: Khirbet Tuqu' ), there are the remains of a Byzantine church and monastery.

Geography
It has a mean annual rainfall of 410mm, an average annual temperature of 17 degree Celsius, and an average annual humidity of c. 60 percent.

Demographics
Tekoa is populated by a mix of religious Zionists and secular Israelis. Many new immigrants from the former Soviet Union also live in Tekoa. In 2015, the population numbered 3,671.

The former chief rabbi of Tekoa, Menachem Froman, a founding member of Gush Emunim, maintained close ties with PLO and Hamas leaders. Rabbi Froman taught at the local hesder yeshiva headed by Rabbi Adin Steinsaltz.   Froman died in 2013.

Economy
In 1989, the Tekoa Agro-Technology Farm established in 1986 was named Enterprise of the Year by the Israeli Journal of Agricultural Settlements.

Arab-Israeli conflict
In May 2001, two Israeli boys from Tekoa, Koby Mandell and Yosef Ishran, were killed, by unknown person(s) who were never apprehended.

In September 2001 an Israeli was shot and killed in Tekoa when militants opened fire on her family's car.

In February 2002, two Israelis were killed in a shooting attack near Tekoa in an attack that the  Al-Aqsa Martyrs' Brigades claimed responsibility for.

Status under international law
Like all Israeli settlements in the Israeli-occupied territories, Tekoa is considered illegal under international law, though Israeli disputes this. The international community considers Israeli settlements to violate the Fourth Geneva Convention's prohibition on the transfer of an occupying power's civilian population into occupied territory. Israel disputes that the Fourth Geneva Convention applies to the Palestinian territories as they had not been legally held by a sovereign prior to Israel taking control of them. This view has been rejected by the International Court of Justice and the International Committee of the Red Cross.

Notable residents
 Rabbi Menachem Froman, rabbi and peace activist
 Dr. Stephen Wiesner, physicist whose proposals launched the field of quantum information theory, including quantum money (which led to quantum key distribution), quantum multiplexing (the earliest example of oblivious transfer) and superdense coding
 Marc Zell, lawyer.

References

External links
 Tekoa website

Populated places established in 1975
Israeli settlements in the West Bank
Gush Etzion Regional Council
Hebrew Bible cities
1975 establishments in the Israeli Military Governorate
Community settlements